This is a list of power stations in Bangladesh.

waste to energy power 

State-owned Power Development Board (PDB)  will implement this 5MW ipp project.

Nuclear
2.4 GWe Rooppur Nuclear Power Plant is under construction. The two units of VVER-1200/523 generating 2.4 GWe are planned to be operational in 2023 and 2024.

Coal fired 

Under Construction

Oil and Gas-fired Thermal

Under Construction

Gas turbines 

Bheramara 360mw

Gas engines

Hydroelectric

Solar PV 
There are a number of utility scale solar PV farms proposed in Bangladesh: 28 MW Teknaf Solar Park, 50 MW Sutiakhali, Mymensingh Solar Park and 32 MW Sunamganj Solar Park. US company SunEdison was the sponsor of the 200 MW Teknaf project while Singapore based entities Sinenergy Holdings, Ditrolic and local company IFDC Solar are the sponsors of the 50 MW Sutiakhali Solar Park. Edisun Power Point & Haor Bangla - Korea Green Energy Ltd is the 32 MW Sunamganj solar park project.

The government has taken a total of 19 solar power projects of total 1070 MW capacity which got the Prime Minister's approval in principle as part of its plan to generate 10 percent electricity from renewable energy source by 2020.

Of these, power purchase agreements (PPAs) were signed for only six projects of 532 MW, while nine projects of 483MW await the PPA signing and four are in the process of project selection committee. Sun Solar Power Plant Ltd. installed a 5 MW Solar power plant in
Sylhet

Combined Cycle

See also

Electricity sector in Bangladesh
Energy policy of Bangladesh

References

Externals 

Power stations
Bangladesh
 
Economy of Bangladesh-related lists